Grousbeck is a surname. Notable people with the surname include:

Anne Grousbeck (born 1966), American tennis player
H. Irving Grousbeck (born 1934), American businessman and professor
Wyc Grousbeck (born 1961), American businessman